Barkhatovo is a rural locality (a selo) in Ongudaysky District, the Altai Republic, Russia. The population was 9 as of 2016.

Geography 
Barkhatovo is located 34 km northwest of Onguday (the district's administrative centre) by road. Neftebaza and Tuyekta are the nearest rural localities.

References 

Rural localities in Ongudaysky District